Large-scale Atomic/Molecular Massively Parallel Simulator (LAMMPS) is a molecular dynamics program from Sandia National Laboratories. LAMMPS makes use of Message Passing Interface (MPI) for parallel communication and is free and open-source software, distributed under the terms of the GNU General Public License.

LAMMPS was originally developed under a Cooperative Research and Development Agreement (CRADA) between two laboratories from United States Department of Energy and three other laboratories from private sector firms. , it is maintained and distributed by researchers at the Sandia National Laboratories and Temple University.

Features 

For computing efficiency, LAMMPS uses neighbor lists (Verlet lists) to keep track of nearby particles. The lists are optimized for systems with particles that repel at short distances, so that the local density of particles never grows too large.

On parallel computers, LAMMPS uses spatial-decomposition techniques to partition the simulation domain into small 3d sub-domains, one of which is assigned to each processor. Processors communicate and store ghost atom information for atoms that border their subdomain. LAMMPS is most efficient (in a parallel computing sense) for systems whose particles fill a 3D rectangular box with approximately uniform density.

LAMMPS also allows for coupled spin and molecular dynamics in an accelerated fashion.

LAMMPS is coupled to many analysis tools and engines as well.

See also 
 Parallel computing
 Comparison of software for molecular mechanics modeling
 Molecular design software
List of free and open-source software packages

References

External links 
 

Molecular dynamics software
Free science software
Sandia National Laboratories